Astrolabe was a converted flûte of the French Navy, famous for her travels with Jean-François de Galaup, comte de Lapérouse.

She was built in 1781 at Le Havre as the flûte Autruche for the French Navy. In May 1785 she and her sistership Boussole (previously Portefaix) were renamed and rerated as frigates, and fitted for round-the-world scientific exploration. The two ships departed from Brest on 1 August 1785, Boussole commanded by Lapérouse and Astrolabe under Paul Antoine Fleuriot de Langle.

Disappearance

The expedition vanished mysteriously in 1788 after leaving Botany Bay on 10 March 1788. Captain Peter Dillon in  solved the mystery in 1827 when he found remnants of the ships Astrolabe and Boussole at Vanikoro Island in the Solomon Islands. Local inhabitants reported that the ships had been wrecked in a storm.

Survivors from one ship had been massacred, while survivors from the other ship had constructed their own small boat and sailed off the island, never to be heard from again.

Legacy 
The fate of Lapérouse, his ships and crew was a subject of mystery for some years. Louis XVI reportedly often inquired whether any news had come from the expedition, up to shortly before his execution. It is also notably the subject of a chapter from Twenty Thousand Leagues Under the Sea by Jules Verne.

Objects recovered from the wreck are part of the collection of the Maritime Museum of New Caledonia.

See also
 European and American voyages of scientific exploration

Note

Its crew included French priest Louis Receveur the first Catholic and second non-indigenous person to be buried in Australia.

References

Exploration ships
1781 ships
Maritime incidents in 1788